The Komsomolsk-na-Amure Constituency (No.70) is a Russian legislative constituency in the Khabarovsk Krai. In 1993-2007 the constituency was included most of upstate Khabarovsk Krai and the city of Komsomolsk-on-Amur. However, the Komsomolsk-na-Amure constituency was gerrymandered in 2016, and now consists of not just northern Khabarovsk Krai and Komsomolsk-na-Amure, but also of eastern Khabarovsk and its suburbs.

Members elected

Election results

1993

|-
! colspan=2 style="background-color:#E9E9E9;text-align:left;vertical-align:top;" |Candidate
! style="background-color:#E9E9E9;text-align:left;vertical-align:top;" |Party
! style="background-color:#E9E9E9;text-align:right;" |Votes
! style="background-color:#E9E9E9;text-align:right;" |%
|-
|style="background-color: " |
|align=left|Vladimir Baryshev
|align=left|Independent
|71,475
|29.06%
|-
|style="background-color: " |
|align=left|Boris Khachaturyan
|align=left|Independent
| -
|20.70%
|-
| colspan="5" style="background-color:#E9E9E9;"|
|- style="font-weight:bold"
| colspan="3" style="text-align:left;" | Total
| 245,929
| 100%
|-
| colspan="5" style="background-color:#E9E9E9;"|
|- style="font-weight:bold"
| colspan="4" |Source:
|
|}

1995

|-
! colspan=2 style="background-color:#E9E9E9;text-align:left;vertical-align:top;" |Candidate
! style="background-color:#E9E9E9;text-align:left;vertical-align:top;" |Party
! style="background-color:#E9E9E9;text-align:right;" |Votes
! style="background-color:#E9E9E9;text-align:right;" |%
|-
|style="background-color: " |
|align=left|Nikolay Kamyshinsky
|align=left|Communist Party
|70,977
|21.70%
|-
|style="background-color: " |
|align=left|Valery Ponomarev
|align=left|Independent
|45,058
|13.78%
|-
|style="background-color: " |
|align=left|Vladimir Baryshev (incumbent)
|align=left|Independent
|43,003
|13.15%
|-
|style="background-color: #3C3E42" |
|align=left|Vyacheslav Shport
|align=left|Duma-96
|17,217
|5.26%
|-
|style="background-color: " |
|align=left|Sergey Loktionov
|align=left|Independent
|14,585
|4.46%
|-
|style="background-color: #2C299A" |
|align=left|Dmitry Bubenin
|align=left|Congress of Russian Communities
|13,640
|4.17%
|-
|style="background-color: " |
|align=left|Yury Maryin
|align=left|Liberal Democratic Party
|13,072
|4.00%
|-
|style="background-color: " |
|align=left|Tatyana Bolyakova
|align=left|Agrarian Party
|12,156
|3.72%
|-
|style="background-color: " |
|align=left|Vladimir Barikov
|align=left|Independent
|10,263
|3.14%
|-
|style="background-color: " |
|align=left|Valery Vlasenko
|align=left|Independent
|9,536
|2.92%
|-
|style="background-color: " |
|align=left|Konstantin Podkorytov
|align=left|Independent
|7,115
|2.18%
|-
|style="background-color: " |
|align=left|Yury Sapronov
|align=left|Independent
|6,456
|1.97%
|-
|style="background-color: "|
|align=left|Nikolay Stel'makh
|align=left|Power to the People!
|6,393
|1.95%
|-
|style="background-color: #F21A29" |
|align=left|Grigory Sobolev
|align=left|Trade Unions and Industrialists – Union of Labour
|6,216
|1.90%
|-
|style="background-color: " |
|align=left|Oleg Gerasimov
|align=left|Independent
|4,392
|1.34%
|-
|style="background-color: #DD137B" |
|align=left|Nikolay Pustovetov
|align=left|Social Democrats
|4,392
|1.34%
|-
|style="background-color:#000000"|
|colspan=2 |against all
|39,221
|11.99%
|-
| colspan="5" style="background-color:#E9E9E9;"|
|- style="font-weight:bold"
| colspan="3" style="text-align:left;" | Total
| 327,053
| 100%
|-
| colspan="5" style="background-color:#E9E9E9;"|
|- style="font-weight:bold"
| colspan="4" |Source:
|
|}

1999

|-
! colspan=2 style="background-color:#E9E9E9;text-align:left;vertical-align:top;" |Candidate
! style="background-color:#E9E9E9;text-align:left;vertical-align:top;" |Party
! style="background-color:#E9E9E9;text-align:right;" |Votes
! style="background-color:#E9E9E9;text-align:right;" |%
|-
|style="background-color: "|
|align=left|Vyacheslav Shport
|align=left|Independent
|136,620
|46.24%
|-
|style="background-color:"|
|align=left|Nikolay Kamyshinsky (incumbent)
|align=left|Independent
|103,313
|34.97%
|-
|style="background-color:"|
|align=left|Ruslan Khasbulatov
|align=left|Independent
|17,273
|5.85%
|-
|style="background-color:#000000"|
|colspan=2 |against all
|32,839
|11.11%
|-
| colspan="5" style="background-color:#E9E9E9;"|
|- style="font-weight:bold"
| colspan="3" style="text-align:left;" | Total
| 295,461
| 100%
|-
| colspan="5" style="background-color:#E9E9E9;"|
|- style="font-weight:bold"
| colspan="4" |Source:
|
|}

2003

|-
! colspan=2 style="background-color:#E9E9E9;text-align:left;vertical-align:top;" |Candidate
! style="background-color:#E9E9E9;text-align:left;vertical-align:top;" |Party
! style="background-color:#E9E9E9;text-align:right;" |Votes
! style="background-color:#E9E9E9;text-align:right;" |%
|-
|style="background-color: "|
|align=left|Vyacheslav Shport (incumbent)
|align=left|Independent
|148,473
|60.45%
|-
|style="background-color: " |
|align=left|Anatoly Dronchenko
|align=left|Communist Party
|35,743
|14.55%
|-
|style="background-color: " |
|align=left|Yury Kretov
|align=left|Liberal Democratic Party
|14,248
|5.80%
|-
|style="background-color: " |
|align=left|Grigory Barabanov
|align=left|Independent
|7,556
|3.08%
|-
|style="background-color:#000000"|
|colspan=2 |against all
|35,879
|14.61%
|-
| colspan="5" style="background-color:#E9E9E9;"|
|- style="font-weight:bold"
| colspan="3" style="text-align:left;" | Total
| 245,878
| 100%
|-
| colspan="5" style="background-color:#E9E9E9;"|
|- style="font-weight:bold"
| colspan="4" |Source:
|
|}

2016

|-
! colspan=2 style="background-color:#E9E9E9;text-align:left;vertical-align:top;" |Candidate
! style="background-color:#E9E9E9;text-align:left;vertical-align:top;" |Party
! style="background-color:#E9E9E9;text-align:right;" |Votes
! style="background-color:#E9E9E9;text-align:right;" |%
|-
|style="background-color: " |
|align=left|Sergey Furgal
|align=left|Liberal Democratic Party
|63,906
|36.71%
|-
|style="background-color: " |
|align=left|Vadim Voyevodin
|align=left|Communist Party
|38,876
|22.33%
|-
|style="background-color: " |
|align=left|Yevgeny Sysoyev
|align=left|A Just Russia
|27,245
|15.65%
|-
|style="background: #E62020;"| 
|align=left|Dmitry Doskov
|align=left|Communists of Russia
|10,171
|5.84%
|-
|style="background-color: " |
|align=left|Oleg Pankov
|align=left|Yabloko
|9,384
|5.39%
|-
|style="background-color: " |
|align=left|Eduard Shvetsov
|align=left|Rodina
|7,043
|4.05%
|-
|style="background: ;"| 
|align=left|Aleksandr Simontsev
|align=left|People's Freedom Party
|3,509
|2.02%
|-
| colspan="5" style="background-color:#E9E9E9;"|
|- style="font-weight:bold"
| colspan="3" style="text-align:left;" | Total
| 174,083
| 100%
|-
| colspan="5" style="background-color:#E9E9E9;"|
|- style="font-weight:bold"
| colspan="4" |Source:
|
|}

2019

|-
! colspan=2 style="background-color:#E9E9E9;text-align:left;vertical-align:top;" |Candidate
! style="background-color:#E9E9E9;text-align:left;vertical-align:top;" |Party
! style="background-color:#E9E9E9;text-align:right;" |Votes
! style="background-color:#E9E9E9;text-align:right;" |%
|-
|style="background-color: " |
|align=left|Ivan Pilyaev
|align=left|Liberal Democratic Party
|65,596
|39.12%
|-
|style="background-color: " |
|align=left|Nikolay Platoshkin
|align=left|Communist Party
|41,398
|24.69%
|-
|style="background-color: " |
|align=left|Viktoria Tsyganova
|align=left|United Russia
|17,901
|10.68%
|-
|style="background-color: " |
|align=left|Tatyana Yaroslavtseva
|align=left|A Just Russia
|7,887
|4.70%
|-
|style="background-color: " |
|align=left|Nikolay Yevseenko
|align=left|Party of Pensioners
|5,637
|3.36%
|-
|style="background: ;"| 
|align=left|Andrey Petrov
|align=left|The Greens
|5,167
|3.08%
|-
|style="background: #E62020;"| 
|align=left|Vladimir Titorenko
|align=left|Communists of Russia
|4,898
|2.92%
|-
|style="background-color: " |
|align=left|Vladimir Vorobyev
|align=left|Rodina
|3,420
|2.04%
|-
|style="background-color: " |
|align=left|Andrey Shvetsov
|align=left|Party of Growth
|3,020
|1.80%
|-
|style="background-color: " |
|align=left|Oleg Kotov
|align=left|Patriots of Russia
|2,989
|1.78%
|-
| colspan="5" style="background-color:#E9E9E9;"|
|- style="font-weight:bold"
| colspan="3" style="text-align:left;" | Total
| 167,685
| 100%
|-
| colspan="5" style="background-color:#E9E9E9;"|
|- style="font-weight:bold"
| colspan="4" |Source:
|
|}

2021

|-
! colspan=2 style="background-color:#E9E9E9;text-align:left;vertical-align:top;" |Candidate
! style="background-color:#E9E9E9;text-align:left;vertical-align:top;" |Party
! style="background-color:#E9E9E9;text-align:right;" |Votes
! style="background-color:#E9E9E9;text-align:right;" |%
|-
|style="background-color: " |
|align=left|Pavel Simigin
|align=left|United Russia
|36,998
|18.14%
|-
|style="background-color: " |
|align=left|Larisa Zvinyatskaya
|align=left|Communists of Russia
|32,913
|16.14%
|-
|style="background-color: " |
|align=left|Ivan Pilyaev (incumbent)
|align=left|Liberal Democratic Party
|31,034
|15.22%
|-
|style="background-color: " |
|align=left|Natalya Yevdokimova
|align=left|Party of Pensioners
|23,799
|11.67%
|-
|style="background-color: " |
|align=left|Anton Plyusnin
|align=left|A Just Russia — For Truth
|22,131
|10.85%
|-
|style="background-color: "|
|align=left|Yevgeny Ilyin
|align=left|New People
|20,823
|10.21%
|-
|style="background-color: " |
|align=left|Viktor Fedoreev
|align=left|Yabloko
|9,016
|4.42%
|-
|style="background-color: "|
|align=left|Andrey Kalganov
|align=left|Rodina
|5,404
|2.65%
|-
|style="background-color: "|
|align=left|Vladimir Nizhenkovsky
|align=left|Party of Growth
|3,801
|1.86%
|-
| colspan="5" style="background-color:#E9E9E9;"|
|- style="font-weight:bold"
| colspan="3" style="text-align:left;" | Total
| 203,961
| 100%
|-
| colspan="5" style="background-color:#E9E9E9;"|
|- style="font-weight:bold"
| colspan="4" |Source:
|
|}

Notes

Sources
70. Комсомольский одномандатный избирательный округ

References

Russian legislative constituencies
Politics of Khabarovsk Krai